Dead Donkeys Fear No Hyenas, is a 2017 Swedish-Ethiopian documentary thriller film directed by Joakim Demmer and co-produced by Margarete Jangård for WG Film, Heino Deckert for ma.ja.de, and John Webster for JW Documentaries. The film revolves around Farmland , the new green gold in Ethiopia where foreign investors use millions of hectares and dream of prosperity of the local people.

The film has been shot in and around Addis Ababa, Bale Province and Gambela in Ethiopia; New York City, Austin Texas and Washington in the USA and the Gorom refugee camp in South Sudan. The film made its World Premiere CPH:DOX 2017 in the United States. The film received mixed reviews from critics and made official selection at many film festivals. In the Munich International Documentary Festival (DOK.fest) 2017, the film was nominated for the Viktor Award for DOK.horizons and then for Environmental Award at the Sheffield International Documentary Festival.

Cast
 Alexander Karim – Narrator (voice)
 Mohammed Alamoudi – agriculture investor
 Ivan Holmes – farmer and agriculture investor
 Argaw Ashine – Ethiopian reporter
 Abraham D. – native farmer in Gambela Region
 Omot Agwa Okwoy – Gambela National Park official
 Paul McMahon – co-founder and Managing Partner of SLM Partners
 Yitagess Ketema – project manager at Saudi Star Agricultural Development
 Owanyia A. – former Ethiopian civil servant
 Stefan G. Koeberle – director of risk management, World Bank
 Mark King – chief officer of environmental and social standards, World Bank
 Olemo A. – Gambella refugee
 David Pred – co-founder of Inclusive Development International
 Jedowang O. – eyewitness of Ethiopian Army attack on unarmed civilians
 Obang Metho – Ethiopian human rights defender
 Okello O. – forcefully evicted farmer
 Ajullut T. – forcefully evicted farmer
 Okwori P. – forcefully evicted farmer
 Otonge O. – forcefully evicted
 Achalla O. – forcefully evicted
 Olera O.
 Bisrat Negash
 Bedilu Abera
 Mian Nasiruddin

References

External links 
 

2017 films
Swedish documentary films
2017 documentary films
2010s Swedish films